Seyed Mohammad Mousavi Eraghi (born 22 August 1987 in Dezful) is an Iranian volleyball player, who plays as a middle blocker for the Iran men's national volleyball team.

Name
His family is originally from Arak and because in the past the city's name was "Eragh-e Ajam" (meaning Persian Iraq, or non-Arab Iraq) his family name is followed by "Eraghi" (Iraqi).

Career

National team
Mousavi was invited to national team in 2008. He was named Best Blocker at the 2008 Olympic Qualification Tournament, where Iran ended up on sixth place and missed qualification for the 2008 Summer Olympics in Beijing, China. He was named twice the Best Blocker in Asian Championship. He made a brilliant performance in 2013 World League and was named Best Middle Blocker in 2015 World Cup.

Clubs
He started his career in volleyball club Louleh Sazi Ahvaz. He played for Petrochimi Bandar Imam, Paykan Tehran, Giti Pasand Isfahan, Kalleh Mazandaran, Matin Vatamin. Mousavi has won eleven championships while playing for five teams in Iranian Super League.
He has received offers to play for some of the world’s leading teams, including Al Arabi of Qatar and an unnamed Italian Serie A club but decided to play in Iranian League.
He was named the Best Blocker in 2010 Club World Championship with Paykan. He played for three years in Sarmayeh Bank until 2018.
Mousavi joined Indykpol AZS Olsztyn in September 2019. Mohammad Mousavi has been named as the best blocker of the PlusLiga season.

Sporting achievements
 FIVB Club World Championship
  Qatar 2010 – with Paykan Tehran
 AVC Asian Club Championship
  Bahrain 2007 – with Paykan Tehran
  Kazakhstan 2008 – with Paykan Tehran
  United Arab Emirates 2009 – with Paykan Tehran
  China 2010 – with Paykan Tehran
  Iran 2013 – with Kalleh Mazandaran
  Philippines 2014 – with Matin Varamin
  Chinese Taipei 2015 – with Paykan Tehran
  Myanmar 2016 – with Paykan Tehran
  Vietnam 2017 – with Sarmayeh Bank Tehran
 National championships
 2006/2007  Iranian Championship, with Paykan Tehran
 2007/2008  Iranian Championship, with Paykan Tehran
 2008/2009  Iranian Championship, with Paykan Tehran
 2009/2010  Iranian Championship, with Paykan Tehran
 2010/2011  Iranian Championship, with Paykan Tehran
 2012/2013  Iranian Championship, with Kalleh Mazandaran
 2013/2014  Iranian Championship, with Matin Varamin
 2014/2015  Iranian Championship, with Paykan Tehran
 2015/2016  Iranian Championship, with Sarmayeh Bank Tehran
 2016/2017  Iranian Championship, with Sarmayeh Bank Tehran
 2017/2018  Iranian Championship, with Sarmayeh Bank Tehran
 National team
 2004  AVC Asian U21 Championship
 2005  AVC Asian U19 Championship
 2006  AVC Asian U21 Championship
 2007  FIVB U21 World Championship
 2008  AVC Asian Cup
 2009  AVC Asian Championship
 2010  AVC Asian Cup
 2010  Asian Games
 2011  AVC Asian Championship
 2013  AVC Asian Championship
 2014  Asian Games
 2017  FIVB World Grand Champions Cup
 2018  Asian Games
 2019  AVC Asian Championship

Individually
Best Spiker: 2005 U19 World Championship
Best Blocker: 2006 Asian U21 Championship
Best Blocker: 2007 Asian Club Championship
Best Blocker: 2008 3rd World Olympic Qualification Tournament
Best Blocker: 2009 Asian Championship
Best Blocker: 2010 Club World Championship
Best Blocker: 2013 Asian Club Championship
Best Blocker: 2013 Asian Championship
Best Middle Blocker: 2014 Asian Club Championship
Best Middle Blocker: 2015 World Cup
Best Middle Blocker: 2016 1st World Olympic Qualification Tournament
Best Middle Blocker: 2016 Asian Club Championship
Best Middle Blocker: 2017 Asian Club Championship
Best Middle Blocker: 2019 Asian Championship

References

External links
 FIVB profile
 Player profile at World Olympic Qualification tournament
 PlusLiga player profile

1987 births
Living people
Iranian men's volleyball players
Iranian expatriate sportspeople in Poland
Expatriate volleyball players in Poland
AZS Olsztyn players
People from Dezful
Asian Games gold medalists for Iran
Asian Games silver medalists for Iran
Asian Games medalists in volleyball
Volleyball players at the 2010 Asian Games
Volleyball players at the 2014 Asian Games
Volleyball players at the 2018 Asian Games
Olympic volleyball players of Iran
Volleyball players at the 2016 Summer Olympics
Medalists at the 2010 Asian Games
Medalists at the 2014 Asian Games
Medalists at the 2018 Asian Games
Iranian expatriate sportspeople in Italy
Iranian expatriate sportspeople in Turkey
Volleyball players at the 2020 Summer Olympics
Middle blockers
Sportspeople from Khuzestan province
21st-century Iranian people